Westraltrachia inopinata is a species of air-breathing land snails, a terrestrial pulmonate gastropod mollusk in the family Camaenidae.

Distribution
This species is endemic to Western Australia and occurs at the south side of the Napier Range.

References

 Solem, A. 1984. Camaenid land snails from Western and Central Australia (Mollusca : Pulmonata : Camaenidae). IV. Taxa from the Kimberley, Westraltrachia Iredale, 1933 and related genera. Records of the Western Australian Museum, Supplement 17: 427-705
 2006 IUCN Red List of Threatened Species.   Downloaded on 7 August 2007.

Gastropods of Australia
inopinata
Vulnerable fauna of Australia
Gastropods described in 1984
Taxonomy articles created by Polbot